The New South Wales Minister for Finance is a minister of the New South Wales Government within The Treasury and has responsibilities for matters relating to revenue collection policy and regulation in the state of New South Wales, Australia. 

The current minister, since 2 April 2019, is Damien Tudehope.

The minister is supported by the Minister for Small Business who has responsibilities for matters relating to small business policy and regulation in New South Wales. The current Minister for Small Business, since 21 December 2021, is Eleni Petinos.

The minister administers the portfolio and supports the Treasurer of New South Wales, presently Matt Kean, through The Treasury cluster, predominantly through The Treasury, the Office of State Revenue, and associated government agencies.

Ultimately the minister is responsible to the Parliament of New South Wales.

List of ministers

Finance

Related ministerial titles

Commerce

Assistant Treasurers

Assistant minister

See also 

List of New South Wales government agencies

References

External links
 NSW Department of Industry, Skills and Regional Development (NSW Department of Industry)

Finance